The 1993–94 CIS Insurance Rugby Union County Championship was the 94th edition of England's County Championship rugby union club competition. 

Yorkshire won their 12th title after defeating Durham in the final.

Final 

`

See also
 English rugby union system
 Rugby union in England

References

Rugby Union County Championship
County Championship (rugby union) seasons